George Clarke (1661–1736) was a British Judge Advocate General, Secretary at War, Lord Commissioner of the Admiralty.

George Clarke may also refer to:

Arts and entertainment
George Clarke (filmmaker), film director from Northern Ireland
George Elliott Clarke (born 1960), Canadian poet and playwright
George Clarke (architect) (born 1974), British architect and television presenter
George Clarke (handyman), personality on the Late Show with David Letterman
George Somers Leigh Clarke (1822–1882), English architect
George Clarke (musician), lead singer of Deafheaven
George Clarke (jazz musician) (1911–1985), American jazz saxophonist
George Clarke (actor) (1840–1906), American stage actor
George Clarke (comedian) (1886–1946), English stage comedian

Politics
George Clarke (governor) (1676–1760), colonial New York, 1736–1743
George Clarke (New Zealand pioneer) (1823–1913), pioneer and educationist
George Clarke, 1st Baron Sydenham of Combe (1848–1933), British colonial administrator
George W. Clarke (Iowa politician) (1852–1936), governor of Iowa
George W. Clarke (Newfoundland politician) (1910–2000), Newfoundland lawyer and politician
George W. Clarke (Washington politician) (1906–2006), American politician in the state of Washington
George Johnson Clarke (1857–1917), Premier of New Brunswick
George Clarke (Canadian politician) (1827–?), politician in Nova Scotia
George Clarke (judge) (1798–1875), New Zealand missionary, teacher, public servant, politician and judge
George J. F. Clarke (1774–1836), active in East Florida in the Second Spanish Period
George L. Clarke (1813–1890), mayor of Providence, Rhode Island
George Thomas Clarke (1853–1925), Australian local government politician

Sport
George Clarke (cricketer) (1869–1955), English cricketer
George Clarke (footballer, born 1894) (1894–1960), footballer for Crewe Alexandra and Stoke
George Clarke (footballer, born 1900) (1900–1977), English football player (Aston Villa, Crystal Palace, QPR)
George Clarke (footballer, born 1921) (1921–2011), English football player (Ipswich Town)
George Clarke (winger) (fl. 1908–1910), English professional association footballer who played as a winger

Other
George Clarke (1768–1835), New York landowner who commissioned the construction of Hyde Hall 
George Clarke (priest) (1793–1871), Archdeacon of Antigua
George Aubourne Clarke (died 1949), Scottish meteorologist
George Clarke (prospector) (1846–1895), prospector in Queensland, Australia
George Calvert Clarke (1814–1900), British Army officer
George Frederick Clarke (1883–1974), New Brunswick author, historian and amateur archaeologist
George Clarke (architect-planner) (1932–2005), Australian town planner during the 1970s
George Marshall Clarke, African American barber in Milwaukee, Wisconsin, lynched in 1861
George Clarke (convict) (1806–1835), convict and bushranger known as "The Barber"

See also
George Clark (disambiguation)
George Clerk (disambiguation)